The 1910 Michigan Agricultural Aggies football team represented Michigan Agricultural College (MAC) as an independent during the 1910 college football season. In their eighth year under head coach Chester Brewer, the Aggies compiled a 6–1 record and outscored their opponents 168 to 8. Ion Cortright was the team captain. The season was regarded as the best in Michigan Agricultural football history up to that point.

Schedule

Game summaries

Michigan

On October 15, 1910, the Aggies lost to Michigan by a 6 to 3 score at Ferry Field. Michigan had a 3–0–1 record in the four prior meetings, outscoring the Aggies by a combined total of 204 to 0.  Prior to the Michigan game, the M. A. C. student body adopted the slogan, "On to Michigan."

After a scoreless first half, the Aggies blocked two Michigan punts in the third quarter.  On the second occasion, Michigan kicked from its 50-yard line, and the low punt was blocked and rolled to Michigan's 12-yard line where the Aggies' left tackle Campbell recovered the ball.  After Michigan stopped two runs, the Aggies' right halfback, Hill, kicked a field goal from the 21-yard line.  The Aggies' maintained a 3–0 into the fourth quarter.  With less than five minutes left in the game, Michigan's Shorty McMillan completed a pass to Stanley Borleske who ran 50 yards to the Aggies' 15-yard line.  Don Green then carried the ball to the three-yard line.  Due to a penalty, the Wolverines had five unsuccessful chances to score the touchdown after advancing to the three-yard line.  Michigan then lined up for a field goal, but the play was a fake.  Green took the snap from center and ran for the touchdown.  Conklin kicked the extra point, and Michigan won by a score of 6 to 3.

After the game, Coach Yost praised the Michigan Agricultural team as "remarkably strong."

Players
 Ernest W. Baldwin, guard, Midland, Michigan
 James F. Campbell, tackle, Charlevoix, Michigan
 Edward G. Culver, guard, Midland, Michigan
 Leon J. Hill, halfback, Benton Harbor, Michigan
 Faunt V. Lenardson, guard, Britton, Michigan
 James E. McWilliams, center
 Roy M. Montford, end, Benton Harbor, Michigan
 Benjamin P. Patterson, tackle, Caro, Michigan
 William R. Riblet, quarterback, Elkhart, Indiana
 Fred A. Stone, end, Clare, Michigan

Notes

References

Michigan Agricultural
Michigan State Spartans football seasons
Michigan Agricultural Aggies football